Maksim Danilin may refer to:

 Maksim Danilin (footballer, born 1979), Russian football player
 Maksim Danilin (footballer, born May 2001), Russian football player with FC Dynamo Moscow
 Maksim Danilin (footballer, born September 2001), Russian football player with FC Spartak-2 Moscow